Ketchell is a surname. Notable people with the surname include:

 Aaron Ketchell (born 1977), Australian former professional rugby league footballer
 James Ketchell (born 1982), British adventurer

See also
 Kitchell, surname
 Stanley Ketchel (1886–1910), American boxer